Claudia Giovine and Karin Knapp were the defending champions, but both chose not to participate.
Valentyna Ivakhnenko and Marina Melnikova won the title, defeating Tímea Babos and Magda Linette 6–4, 7–5 in the final.

Seeds

Draw

Draw

References
 Main Draw

Save Cup - Doubles
Save Cup
2011 in Italian tennis